Marchenko and Martchenko is a Ukrainian surname of the following people:
 Alexei Marchenko (born 1992), Russian ice hockey defenceman
 Anatoly Marchenko (1938-1986), Russian author
 Daria Marchenko, Ukrainian artist
 Grigori Marchenko (born 1959), Kazakh financier
 Illya Marchenko (born 1987), Ukrainian tennis player
 Ivan Marchenko (1911-1943), Ukrainian Treblinka guard
 Kirill Marchenko (born 2000), Russian ice hockey winger
 Maksym Marchenko (born 1983), Ukrainian colonel and the current governor of Odessa Oblast
 Michael Martchenko (born 1942), Canadian illustrator
 Oleksiy Marchenko (died 1921), Ukrainian military commander
 Vladimir Marchenko, Soviet-Ukrainian mathematician
 Vladimir Marchenko (gymnast) (born 1952), Russian Olympic athlete
 Yevgeny Marchenko — several people

See also
 

Ukrainian-language surnames
Surnames of Ukrainian origin
Patronymic surnames